Gunay İsmayilova (born 8 March 1998) is an Azerbaijani footballer, who plays as a goalkeeper for Amed SFK and the Azerbaijan women's national team.

Club career 
İsmayilova played in her country for Fidan F.C. By November 2017, she moved to Turkey, and signed a six-month deal with the Women's First League club Beliktaş J.K.. In the second half of the 2017–18 First League, she transferred to Kireçburnu Spor. In November 2021, she left Turkey. Mid October 2022, she moved to Turkey again, and joined the Diyarbakır-based club Amed SFK to play in the 2022–23 Super Leafue. In November 2021, she left Turkey.

International career 
She is a member of the Azerbaijan women's national football team.

References 

1998 births
Living people
Azerbaijani women's footballers
Women's association football goalkeepers
Azerbaijan women's international footballers
Azerbaijani expatriate footballers
Azerbaijani expatriate sportspeople in Turkey
Expatriate women's footballers in Turkey
Beşiktaş J.K. women's football players
Kireçburnu Spor players
Turkish Women's Football Super League players
Amed S.K. (women) players